Suså may refer to:

 Suså Municipality, a former municipality in Zealand, Denmark
 Suså River, a river in Zealand, Denmark

See also
Susa (disambiguation)